<< List of Vanity Fair caricatures (1885-1889) >> List of Vanity Fair caricatures (1895-1899)

The following is from a list of caricatures  published 1890–1894 by the British magazine Vanity Fair (1868–1914).

Next List of Vanity Fair (British magazine) caricatures (1895-1899)

 
1890s in the United Kingdom